Kaveree Bamzai is an Indian journalist, author and film critic. She is the only woman to have been the editor of India Today magazine, where she worked for 30 years. She worked for The Times of India and The Indian Express before. She has been Editor-at-large for India Today since 2014. Her book, No Regrets, received positive reviews. So did The Three Khan, written about the three Khans of Bollywood.

Bibliography

References

Indian people of Kashmiri descent
Indian film critics
Indian journalists
Living people
Kashmiri people
Kashmiri Pandits
Indian women
The Times of India journalists
Year of birth missing (living people)